Adventure Time is an American animated television media franchise created by Pendleton Ward for Cartoon Network. The first series, Adventure Time (2010–2018), follows the adventures of Finn (voiced by Jeremy Shada), a human boy, and his best friend and adoptive brother Jake (John DiMaggio), a dog with magical powers to change shape and grow and shrink at will. Finn and Jake live in the post-apocalyptic Land of Ooo. Throughout the series, they interact with the show's other main characters: Princess Bubblegum (Hynden Walch), the sovereign of the Candy Kingdom and a sentient piece of gum; the Ice King (Tom Kenny), a demented but largely misunderstood ice wizard; Marceline the Vampire Queen (Olivia Olson), a thousand-year-old vampire and rock music enthusiast; Lumpy Space Princess (Pendleton Ward), a melodramatic and immature princess made out of "irradiated stardust"; BMO (Niki Yang), a sentient video game console-shaped robot that lives with Finn and Jake; and Flame Princess (Jessica DiCicco), a flame elemental and ruler of the Fire Kingdom. The pilot first aired in 2007 on Nicktoons Network, where it was later re-aired on the incubator series Random! Cartoons. The pilot was eventually uploaded onto the internet and became a cult hit on YouTube. After Nickelodeon declined to turn the short into a full-fledged show, Cartoon Network purchased the rights, and Adventure Time launched as a series on April 5, 2010. The series concluded its eight-year and ten-season run on September 3, 2018. The series was followed by two limited-run spinoffs: Adventure Time: Distant Lands (202021) and Adventure Time: Fionna and Cake.

Each Adventure Time episode is about eleven minutes in length; pairs of episodes are often telecast in order to fill a half-hour program time slot. For the first five seasons, the show aired on Monday nights. However, starting with the early sixth-season episode "Breezy", the show began to shift both its timeslot and its day of airing. Upon its debut, Adventure Time was a ratings success for Cartoon Network, with its highest-rated episodes scoring over 3 million viewers. The show received universal acclaim from critics and has developed a strong following among teenagers and adults, many of whom are attracted due to the series' animation, stories, and characters. Adventure Time has won three Annie Awards, eight Primetime Emmy Awards, two British Academy Children's Awards, a Motion Picture Sound Editors Award, a Pixel Award, a Peabody Award, and a Kerrang! Award. The series has also been nominated for three Critics' Choice Television Awards, two Annecy Festival Awards, a TCA Award, and a Sundance Film Festival Award, among others. Domestically, several compilation DVDs containing a random assortment of episodes have been released; additionally, all the seasons have been released in North America on DVD and seasons one to six were released on Blu-ray. All seasons were released on Blu-ray in Australia only. A North American box set containing the entire series was also released on DVD on April 30, 2019. During its run, Adventure Time was a co-production between Frederator Studios and Cartoon Network Studios.

Series overview

Episodes

Pilot (2007)

Season 1 (2010)

Season 2 (2010–11)

Season 3 (2011–12)

Season 4 (2012)

Season 5 (2012–14)

Season 6 (2014–15)

Season 7 (2015–16)

Season 8 (2016–17)

Season 9 (2017)

Season 10 (2017–18)

Special

"Diamonds and Lemons" (2018) 
On November 17, 2017, it was announced that a bonus episode entitled "Diamonds and Lemons" would be produced by Microsoft's gaming studio Mojang. The episode is based on the sandbox video game Minecraft. According to Adam Muto, "Diamonds and Lemons" was produced separately from the show's final season.

Shorts

"The Wand" (2012) 
This short was released on the season one DVD.

"Graybles Allsorts" (2015) 
These shortsreferred to as "Graybles Allsorts" by the Adventure Time production staffwere produced during the show's sixth season. They were released on CartoonNetwork.com between July 6 and November 1, 2015. "Sow, Do You Like Them Apples", the penultimate short, was originally intended to be the final one uploaded, but the shorts were eventually released "slightly out of order". The shorts were eventually re-released on the seventh season DVD.

"Frog Seasons" (2016) 
These were advertised as "Adventure Time shorts" and were produced during the show's seventh season. The first four aired on Cartoon Network between April 2, 2016 and April 23, 2016, and the final short was released exclusively online. Each of these shorts feature Finn and Jake following a crown-carrying frog during a different season of the year. The shorts were eventually re-released on the seventh season DVD.

Home media

DVD releases

Blu-ray releases

Notes 
 Directors
 
 
 
 

 Explanatory notes

References 

 
Lists of Cartoon Network television series episodes
Lists of American children's animated television series episodes
2000s television-related lists
2010s television-related lists